Kenosha is a city in the U.S. state of Wisconsin and the seat of Kenosha County. Per the 2020 census, the population was 99,986 which made it the fourth-largest city in Wisconsin. Situated on the southwestern shore of Lake Michigan, Kenosha is part of the Chicago metropolitan area as defined by the U.S. Census Bureau. Kenosha is located about halfway between Chicago and Milwaukee, and Interstate 94 connects Kenosha to both metropolitan areas.

Kenosha was once a center of industrial activity; it was home to large automotive factories which fueled its economy. Like some other Rust Belt cities, Kenosha lost these factories in the late 20th century, causing it to gradually transition into a services-based economy. In recent years, the city and surrounding county have benefited from increased job growth, and the city has worked on repairing roads and other infrastructure. It is home to the headquarters of the Fortune 1000 tool manufacturer Snap-on Inc., as well as the clothing company Jockey International. Kenosha is home to multiple educational institutions including the University of Wisconsin–Parkside, Carthage College, and Gateway Technical College. Residents of the city are called Kenoshans.

History
The early Ojibwa name is reported as  "trout (pike) come all at once". These refer to the annual spawning of trout, in which thousands of fish entered the rivers from Lake Michigan, providing food for the coming months.

Sites of early human habitation have been discovered in the Kenosha vicinity. It remains unclear if any sites pre-date the Clovis Culture but, if so, those sites would be contemporaneous with the Wisconsin glaciation. Paleo-Indians settled in the area at least 13,500 years ago.

European settlement
The first European settlers, part of the Western Emigration Company, arrived in the early 1830s, from Hannibal and Troy, New York, led by John Bullen, Jr., who sought to purchase enough land for a town. Thwarted in Milwaukee and Racine, the group arrived at Pike Creek on 6 June 1835, building log houses and later homes of frame, native stone, and brick. The first school and churches followed, with platting completed in 1836. As more settlers arrived and the first post office was established, the village was known as Pike Creek, then renamed Southport in 1837, a name which lives on as a southeast-side neighborhood, park, and elementary school, and has been adopted by several businesses.

The area became an important Great Lakes shipping port. In 1850, the village changed its name from Southport to Kenosha which is its current name. The name Kenosha was adapted from the Chippewa word kinoje (pike or pickerel).

Between 1902 and 1988, Kenosha produced millions of automobiles and trucks including makes and models such as Jeffery, Rambler, Nash, Hudson, LaFayette, and American Motors Corporation (AMC). In May 1954, Nash acquired Detroit-based Hudson and the new firm was named American Motors Corporation. A prototype steam car was built in Kenosha by the Sullivan-Becker engineering firm in 1900. Two years later, the Thomas B. Jeffery Company, builders of the Sterling bicycle, began production of the Rambler runabout. In 1902, Rambler and Oldsmobile were the first cars to employ mass-production techniques. The 1903 Rambler was also the first US-built production automobile to use a steering wheel, rather than the then-common tiller-controlled steering. Auto executive Charles W. Nash purchased Jeffery in 1916 and the new company became Nash Motors.

In 1973, residents in the Town of Pleasant Prairie sought to have territory annexed and rezoned to allow for the industrial development of agricultural property. In the ensuing legal battle between Kenosha and Pleasant Prairie, the town accused the city of improperly coercing or bribing agricultural property owners to file for rezoning and annexation in order to obtain city water and electric services that could not be provided by the town. The town argued that industrial development would jeopardize the town's residential nature. The court found the annexation proper, with no illicit bribes or improper conduct by the city.

In partnership with French automaker Renault, AMC manufactured several models in Kenosha in the early 1980s, including the Alliance, which won the 1983 "Car of The Year" award from Motor Trend. Two decades earlier, AMC's 1963 Rambler Classic had also received the award. In 1987, Renault sold its controlling interest in AMC to Chrysler Corporation, which had already contracted with AMC for the production of its M-body midsized cars at the Kenosha plant. The AMC Lakefront plant (1960–1988), a smaller facility, was demolished in 1990 (a chimney-demolition ceremony that June drew 10,000 spectators) and was redeveloped into HarborPark. The area now hosts lakeside condominiums, a large recreational marina, numerous parks and promenades, sculptures, fountains, the Kenosha Public Museum, and the Civil War Museum, all of which are connected by the Kenosha Electric Railway streetcar system.

From the beginning of the 20th century through the 1930s, Italian, Irish, Polish, and German immigrants, many of them skilled craftsmen, made their way to the city and contributed to the city's construction, culture, architecture, music, and literature.

In June 1993, the city installed reproductions of the historic Sheridan LeGrande street lights that were specially designed for Kenosha by Westinghouse Electric in 1928; these can be seen on Sixth Avenue between 54th Street and 59th Place. A classic  downtown electric streetcar system was opened on June 17, 2000, and on September 22, 2014, the Kenosha city council approved a crosstown extension of the system incorporating the existing route between 48th and 61st Streets on both 6th and 8th Avenues.

On December 7, 2021, "Carl the Kenosha Turkey", a turkey who became a social media sensation and local icon, was hit by a vehicle and killed. The turkey was named the city's unofficial mascot in 2020 and was seen by some as a source of positivity as Kenosha faced hardships in 2020–2021.

August 2020 protests and unrest

In the aftermath of the August 2020 police shooting of Jacob Blake, protests, riots, and civil unrest occurred in Kenosha. Demonstrations were marked by daily peaceful protesting followed by confrontations with law enforcement and rioting, looting, vandalism, and arson at night. A state of emergency was declared on August 23, and the National Guard was activated the following day. On August 25, a controversial shooting occurred during the unrest, leading to a polarized response. Both then-President Donald Trump and then-Presidential candidate Joe Biden visited Kenosha.

Protests continued daily through August 29 with approximately 2,000 members of the National Guard assisting the city in restoring order. Damages exceeding $50 million occurred with over 100 businesses affected.

In November 2021, Kenosha once again became the subject of worldwide attention as the jury trial of Kyle Rittenhouse, the defendant in the 2020 unrest shooting, commenced. As part of the city's emergency preparedness, over 500 members of the National Guard were activated ahead of the verdict. Judge Bruce Schroeder dismissed Rittenhouse's unlawful possession charge and the curfew violation charge for being legally unsupported, and a unanimous jury found Rittenhouse not guilty of the remaining charges. Following the verdict on November 19, some protests occurred in Kenosha but remained peaceful.

Historic districts
Kenosha has 21 locations and four districts (Library Park Historic District, Third Avenue Historic District, Civic Center Historic District, and Pearl Street Historic District) listed on the National Register of Historic Places. The city has a Kenosha Landmarks Commission, and among the many local city-designated landmarks are the 1929 YMCA, the Manor House, the John McCaffary House, the St. Matthew Episcopal Church, the Washington Park Clubhouse, and the Justin Weed House.

Geography
Kenosha is in southeastern Wisconsin, bordered by Lake Michigan to the east, the village of Somers to the north, the village of Bristol to the west, and the village of Pleasant Prairie to the south. Kenosha's passenger train station is the last stop on Chicago's Union Pacific North Metra Line. Kenosha is 32 miles south of Milwaukee and 49 miles north of Chicago.

Neighborhoods
Kenosha is home to a mixture of blue and white collar workers as well as students who attend the local universities. Kenosha consists of neighborhoods divided into three regions - Downtown, Uptown, and West of I-94 (referred to by locals at "West of the I" or simply "the county"). The city's northside is home to both UW-Parkside and Carthage College.

Downtown

Kenosha's downtown is located along the Lake Michigan shoreline and consists of government buildings, parks, beaches, restaurants, shops, museums, and entertainment venues. The neighborhood of HarborPark is both a residential and commercial area. Directly south of the Downtown area is the neighborhood of Allendale.

Uptown 
Uptown Kenosha consists of a largely blue-collar population and is a mixture of locally owned businesses and residential areas. The neighborhood was heavily impacted by the damage caused during the August 2020 unrest but there are continued plans for ongoing development of the area. Prominent Uptown neighborhoods include Brass, Lincoln Park, and Wilson Heights.

Climate
Kenosha has a humid continental climate (Köppen Dfa, bordering on Dfb) with warm summers and cold winters. The record low is  set in January 1985.

Demographics

2020 census

Note: the US Census treats Hispanic/Latino as an ethnic category. This table excludes Latinos from the racial categories and assigns them to a separate category. Hispanics/Latinos can be of any race.

As of the census of 2020, the population was 99,986. Ethnically, the population was 19.7% Hispanic or Latino of any race. When grouping both Hispanic and non-Hispanic people together by race, the city was 67.9% White, 10.8% Black or African American, 1.9% Asian, 0.5% Native American, 0.1% Pacific Islander, 7.3% from other races, and 11.5% from two or more races.

The 2020 census population of the city included 592 people incarcerated in adult correctional facilities and 1,790 people in student housing.

24.6% of residents were under the age of 18, 13.3% were above of the age of 65, and the gender makeup was 48.7% male and 51.3% female. 9.0% of residents were foreign born. 88.4% of residents possessed a high school education and 25.7% had a bachelor's degree or higher. The medium household income was $56,113, with 15.6% of residents living below the poverty line.

2019 United States Census Bureau American Community Survey estimates

2010 census
As of the census of 2010, there were 99,218 people, 37,376 households, and 24,090 families residing in the city. The racial makeup of the city was 77.1% White, 10.0% African American, 0.6% Native American, 1.7% Asian, 0.1% Pacific Islander, 6.8% from other races, and 3.8% from two or more races. Hispanic or Latino people of any race were 16.3% of the population.

There were 37,376 households, of which 36.8% had children under the age of 18 living with them, 42.9% were married couples living together, 15.9% had a female householder with no husband present, 5.7% had a male householder with no wife present, and 35.5% were non-families. 28.8% of all households were made up of individuals, and 9.7% had someone living alone who was 65 years of age or older. The average household size was 2.56 and the average family size was 3.17.

The median age in the city was 33.5 years. 26.8% of residents were under the age of 18; 10.9% were between the ages of 18 and 24; 28.3% were from 25 to 44; 23.2% were from 45 to 64; and 10.8% were 65 years of age or older. The gender makeup of the city was 49.1% male and 50.9% female.

The 2010 census reported that 51 percent of Kenosha residents moved in from other cities and states. The Chamber of Commerce attributed this to the city's museums, lakeshore attractions, cultural and work opportunities, its public-school system, transportation amenities, and relatively lower costs-of-living.

The importance of manufacturing jobs in Kenosha continues to diminish with only 11.7 percent or 7,769 of the total workforce of 66,362 area residents involved, a decline of 22 percent since 1990 and much lower than the statewide percentage of 16.4 percent.

The biggest surge in Kenosha employment by percentage has been in the white-collar workforce. From 1990 to 2017, the percentage of Kenosha's workforce in business and professional services grew nearly fivefold from 3.2% of the workforce to 11%, while statewide the trend was slightly more than double. The growth has been both to due new office developments in the city, but also due to new suburban developments as Illinois workers seek more affordable housing.

2000 census
As of the census of 2000, there were 90,352 people, 34,411 households, and 22,539 families residing in the city. The racial makeup of the city was 83.6% White, 7.7% African American, 0.4% Native American, 1.0% Asian, <0.1% Pacific Islander, 4.8% from other races and 2.4% from two or more races. 10.0% of the population were Hispanic of any race. 25.5% were of German, 11.5% Italian, 7.1% Irish and 6.6% Polish ancestry.

There were 34,411 households, out of which 34.1% had children under the age of 18 living with them: 47.1% were married couples living together, 13.9% had a female householder with no husband present and 34.5% were non-families. 28.4% of all households were made up of individuals, and 10.3% had someone living alone who was 65 years of age or older. The average household size was 2.54 and the average family size was 3.13.

In the city, the population included 27.2% under the age of 18, 10.1% from 18 to 24, 31.5% from 25 to 44, 19.0% from 45 to 64, and 12.2% who were 65 years of age or older. The median age was 34 years. For every 100 females, there were 96.7 males. For every 100 females age 18 and over, there were 93.2 males.

Crime

The city's violent crime rate for 2018 was 338.18 per 100,000 people, a 15.94% decline from 2017. In 2019, there were 5 reported homicides and an overall 1,888 crimes per 100,000 people, 7.0% higher than the overall crime rate for Wisconsin but lower than the national average of 2,489 per 100,000 people.

On April 18, 2021, a shooting occurred at the Somers House bar, a popular venue for local college students. Six people were shot, three fatally. Police believe the shooting occurred as a result of a fight within the crowded bar, and one subject was arrested and criminally charged.

By October 2021, Kenosha recorded 12 homicides that year, nearly triple the city's annual average.

Economy

Kenosha was at one time a hub of manufacturing, and is now a bedroom community because of the ease of access to the Chicago-Milwaukee corridor. According to county statistics, 49% of Kenosha's workforce commutes outside of Kenosha County to their positions. Many work in the Chicago metropolitan area, of which Kenosha is a part of, or travel south into Chicago itself, or northward towards the Milwaukee area. The Chicago-area commuter rail network Metra has a route between Downtown Chicago and Kenosha. A 2016 study found that Kenosha's "out-commuters most likely work for positions in healthcare, manufacturing, professional/scientific and technical services. The majority of occupations included management, business/financial, and office/administrative support position", and 73 percent of out-commuters have a bachelor's degree or a higher level of education. Around 2010, some residents moved to and around Kenosha due to the lower housing costs compared to other parts of the Chicago metropolitan area. This allowed some residents to find less expensive housing while remaining part of the Chicago metro area.

Snap-on Tools world headquarters and Jockey International corporate headquarters are in Kenosha. Kenosha has a number of light industrial and distribution companies in outlying business parks. Amazon, Rustoleum, Uline, Associated Wholesale Grocers, and others have warehouses and distribution centers located in Kenosha. In 2022, Square Roots farm opened a fully indoor hydroponic facility within refurbished shipping containers in Kenosha. It is expected to be able to grow 2.4 million packages of fresh produce annually for distribution to the surrounding Chicago metro area and into the Milwaukee metro area.

Tourists spent an estimated $196.6 million in Kenosha County in 2015, with the county ranking fourth in the state in tourist money generated.

Downtown Kenosha sits along the Lake Michigan lakefront. In recent years, organizations such as Downtown Kenosha Inc. (DKI) manage the day-to-day economic development efforts, business support and promotional activities for the district. Downtown Kenosha is home to the Kenosha HarborMarket, a European-style farmer's market held mid-May through mid-October on 2nd Ave bisected by the 56th Street boulevard streetcar line. It hosts stalls with local food products and artisan creations. In addition, the downtown area has a collection of over 50 restaurants, bars, breweries, and shops of various kinds. Frank's Diner, which has been an attraction in downtown Kenosha since 1926, is the oldest diner in the United States and has been featured twice on Guy Fieri's Diners, Drive-Ins and Dives, once in 2007 and again in 2021. Residential developments have also provided added condominiums and apartments.

Near downtown, the Kenosha Public Museum System includes the main Kenosha Public Museum, the Dinosaur Discovery Museum in association with Carthage College and the Smithsonian, and the Kenosha Civil War Museum. On Simmons Island, the Kenosha History Center and adjacent Maritime Museum offer memorabilia from the city's nautical past.

In February 2020, Wisconsin Governor Tony Evers announced $10 million in state funding toward the proposed Kenosha STEM Innovation Center within the Kenosha Innovation Neighborhood (KIN), which is a currently planned 60,000 sq. ft. building to be constructed on the empty 107 acre site of the former Chrysler factory. It will serve as a multi-purpose building dedicated to education, workforce development, and entrepreneurial opportunities. In December 2020, the city announced a plan for the KIN. In July 2021, the federal government awarded Kenosha $4.9 million in federal CARES Act funds toward the neighborhood, and in November, Mayor John Antaramian announced that Lakeview Technology Academy would relocate to the KIN. In March 2022, Evers officially announced $15 million in funding toward the KIN, which is expected to take 8–10 years to be fully completed and will include the collaboration of UW-Parkside, Carthage College, Gateway Technical College, and Herzing University.

Arts and culture
Kenosha's four downtown museums, the Kenosha Public Museum, the Civil War Museum and the Dinosaur Discovery Museum, and the Kenosha Historical Center are Smithsonian Institution affiliates.

Completed in 2001, the Kenosha Public Museum is on the Lake Michigan shoreline. Its main exhibit is a prehistoric woolly mammoth skeleton uncovered in western Kenosha in 1992. Cut-marks on its bones indicate that the animals were butchered by humans using stone tools. Carbon dating indicates their age to be 12,500 radiocarbon years old or 14,500 calendar years old, one thousand radiocarbon years earlier than the previously-accepted presence of humans in the Americas. The museum also displays other ice age and fine art exhibits. A second permanent exhibit on local ecosystems and the history of museums and science opened in 2019.

The Kenosha History Center is adjacent to the 1917 city water treatment plant on Simmons Island adjoining the 1866 Kenosha Light Station. It showcases the history of Kenosha from the time of Native American settlements and the first European settlements to the present day. The 1906 Kenosha North Pier Light sits just east.

Kenosha's  Civil War Museum opened on June 13, 2008. The main exhibit, "The Fiery Trial", opened September 15, 2008. It is a  exhibit offering an interactive experience of the role of six Midwestern states before, during, and after the American Civil War.

The Dinosaur Discovery Museum, designated a federal repository, opened in August 2006 in the historic Old Post Office adjoining the 56th Street streetcar line at Tenth Avenue, and includes an on-site paleontology laboratory operated through the Carthage College Institute of Paleontology.

A maritime museum is located within the restored 1866 Southport Light and Lighthouse Keeper's cottage on Simmons Island.

Cuisine
Kenosha's cuisine mirrors common food culture throughout Wisconsin. It is home to a variety of restaurants including multiple supper clubs and German-American venues. Additionally, the city is home to two award winning drive-in burger stands, The Spot and Big Star. Mars Cheese Castle, a "cheese landmark", is also located in Kenosha. The city has the highest concentration of Italian-Americans in Wisconsin, and as such is rife with Italian-American cuisine, including many pizza restaurants and perhaps the most well-known Italian grocery and delicatessen in Wisconsin, Tenuta's.

In recent years, Kenosha became home to multiple craft breweries, and in 2021 hosted the Great Lakes Brew Fest.

Music
Summer band performances have been performed by Kenosha Pops Concert Band at Kenosha's Sesquicentennial Bandshell in Pennoyer Park since 1988.

The Music of the Stars radio program originated in Kenosha in 1992.

The Kenosha Symphony Orchestra performs concerts in the Reuther Central Auditorium at Walter Reuther Central High School in downtown Kenosha.

Since 2002, the outdoor Peanut Butter and Jam Concert Series has been held every Thursday in July and August at Veterans Memorial Park.

Lincoln Park Live! concerts began in 2005 at Lincoln Park. A number of outdoor jazz events are performed throughout the summer such as HarborPark Jazz.

Bands that have originated in Kenosha include Electric Hellfire Club, Lazarus A.D., Jungle Rot, and Product of Hate.

Festivals
Kenosha is home to a number of summer festivals including the Outta Sight Kite Flight, Taste of Wisconsin, Pike River Rendezvous (a historical reenactment), the Kenosha Classic Cruise-In Car Show, Celebrate America (Fourth of July event), Food Folks & Spokes (a cycling event), Cheese-A-Palooza, and the Border War Beer Fest (brewers from Wisconsin and Illinois competing for best beer).

Since 2017, Kenosha has been the host of Tribute Island, a three-day music festival located at Simmons Island. It features many of the top tribute bands from the Midwest, over 50 bands in total performing on five stages.

Libraries

The Kenosha Public Library, which is part of the Kenosha County Library System, operates in four locations throughout the city: Northside Neighborhood Library, Southwest Neighborhood Library, Uptown Neighborhood Library, and Simmons Neighborhood Library. Daniel H. Burnham designed the 1900 Beaux-Arts Gilbert M. Simmons Memorial Library, which is listed on the National Register of Historic Places.

Sports
The city's oldest sporting club, the Kenosha Yacht Club, was established in 1912.

Kenosha was home to the short lived Kenosha Maroons NFL franchise in 1924. They folded after going 0–4–1. It was also the home of the Kenosha Cardinals, a semi-professional football team between 1937 and 1941 which played at Lake Front Stadium at 58th Street and Third Avenue. Today, Kenosha is home to one semi-professional football team formed in 2007, the Kenosha Cougars. They play in the Northern Lights Football League (NLFL). The Bradford High School Red Devils won a state football championship in 2011.

Several baseball teams have played at Simmons Field on the city's south side, including the Kenosha Comets, charter members of the All-American Girls Professional Baseball League who played in the league from 1943 to 1951. Kenosha was also home to the Frontier League's Kenosha Mammoths in 2003, and the Single-A Kenosha Twins from 1984 to 1992. It is currently home to the Kenosha Kingfish, a collegiate baseball team in the Northwoods League, which played its first game on May 31, 2014, and in 2015 won their first championship. In 2020, it was also home to the K-Town Bobbers, featured in a 26-game "Kenosha Series" against the Kenosha Kingfish in July 2020 as part of the NWL “Pod” system of play adopted for 2020.

In 2022, Kenosha became the home of the Kenosha United F.C. Premier Arena Soccer League. They play their home games in nearby Sturtevant, Wisconsin.

Parks and recreation

Kenosha has  of Lake Michigan shoreline frontage, nearly all of which is public. The city has 74 municipal parks, totaling .

Kenosha's Washington Park includes the oldest operating velodrome in the United States (opened in 1927) at Washington Bowl. The Kenosha Velodrome Association sponsors American Track Cycling sanctioned races and training sessions at the "Bowl" throughout the summer. Races are held on Tuesday evenings from mid-May through August. Free seating is available on the inside of the track, and on important race days concessions are available.

Library Park is home to a statue of Abraham Lincoln by Charles Henry Niehaus as well as a veterans-memorial statue ("Winged Victory") by the Italian sculptor Decco.

Petrifying Springs Park is located on the northside of Kenosha, with parts extending into the neighboring village of Somers. Developed within a northern hardwood forest, the 350-acre park includes hiking trails, an 18-hole golf course, and a Biergarten.

Kenosha has been a Tree City USA since 1982.

Beaches
Simmons Island Park and Beach, 
Alford Park and Beach (three sections: North, East, and West), 
Eichelman Park and Beach,  
Pennoyer Park and Beach,   
Southport Park and Beach,

Golf
The Washington Park Golf Course was dedicated on February 18, 1922, and its 1937 English-cottage clubhouse is a city landmark. Most recently, new private courses have opened, including The Club at Strawberry Creek.

Cycling
Kenosha's Library Park is the home of Food Folks and Spokes, a festival with food booths, entertainment, and a bicycle race that is the first leg of the Tour of America's Dairyland. It was formerly part of the International Cycling Classic's "Superweek". Kenosha is home to the Washington Park Velodrome, the longest-operating 333-meter track; it opened in 1927.

Government

Mayor

Kenosha has an elected mayor, who is the chief executive, and an appointed city administrator, who is the chief operating officer. The mayor is elected every four years. The city's Common Council consists of 17 aldermen from Kenosha's 17 districts (each district having several wards), elected for two-year terms in even-numbered years. The current mayor of Kenosha is John Antaramian, the longest-serving chief executive in the city's history from 1992 to 2008 and from 2016 to the present.

Politics
The city has historically favored the Democratic Party, with the 2016 U.S. Presidential Election being the first time since 1972 that a Republican candidate, Donald Trump, has won in Kenosha County. During the 2020 U.S. Presidential Election, Trump lost Wisconsin but won in Kenosha County for the second time.

Kenosha is represented by Bryan Steil (R) in the United States House of Representatives, and by Ron Johnson (R) and Tammy Baldwin (D) in the United States Senate. Robert Wirch (D) represents Kenosha in the Wisconsin State Senate, and Tip McGuire (D) and Tod Ohnstad (D) represent Kenosha in the Wisconsin State Assembly.

Education

Public schools
The Kenosha Unified School District operates 23 public elementary schools, five middle schools, seven charter schools, and six high schools: Mary D. Bradford High School, George Nelson Tremper High School, Indian Trail High School and Academy, LakeView Technology Academy, Reuther Central High School, and Harborside Academy, the latter a research school that uses the Expeditionary Learning Outward Bound model; it was funded by the Bill and Melinda Gates Foundation.

Private schools
Kenosha's private schools include St. Joseph Catholic Academy, All Saints Catholic School, Bethany Lutheran School, Friedens Lutheran School, Christ Lutheran Academy, Kenosha Montessori School, Shoreland Lutheran High School, and Christian Life School. At the beginning of the 2011–2012 school year, St. Mary's and Our Lady of the Holy Rosary of Pompeii schools became campuses of All Saints Catholic School. Both campuses operate as the same school with the same principal. St. Mark's and St. Joseph High School have also conjoined into Saint Joseph Catholic Academy.

Higher education
Kenosha is home to the University of Wisconsin-Parkside with over 4,000 students, Carthage College with over 2,500 students, and the Kenosha campus of Gateway Technical College.

Concordia University Wisconsin, Cardinal Stritch University, National-Louis University, and Herzing University maintain campuses in Kenosha. Journey Ministry College, a cohort of SUM Bible College and Seminary, was established in 2011.

Media

The primary newspaper of Kenosha County is the Kenosha News, a broadsheet with circulation of around 23,000 copies. Happenings Magazine is an ad-supported entertainment publication distributed at local businesses since 1978. They also publish The Smart Reader, Homes Plus, and other seasonal event-orientated magazines.

Kenosha is considered as part of the Milwaukee television market by A.C. Nielsen. However, due to the huge influx of commuters to Chicago, Charter Spectrum's Kenosha system carries both Chicago and Milwaukee and Chicago. Arbitron classifies Kenosha as part of the Chicago radio market. Five major radio stations broadcast from Kenosha: WLIP (CBS Radio) 1050 AM, Gateway Technical College's WGTD (91.1 FM), a member station of the Wisconsin Public Radio News & Classical Music Network, rock WIIL (95.1 FM) and classic hits WWDV (96.9 FM), which simulcasts Chicago-based WDRV (97.1 FM). The Kenosha Convention and Visitors Bureau operates WPUR937 (1180 AM), a low-power tourist information station.

WPXE (Channel 55), the Ion Television owned-and-operated station for the Milwaukee market, is Kenosha's only locally-licensed television station, though in reality it only mentions Kenosha in its legal IDs. Its transmitter is located with the Milwaukee PBS tower on Milwaukee's north side, and its studios are based in suburban Glendale, thus it serves the entire Milwaukee television market. Kenosha is served by several Chicago-based television and radio stations.

A local podcast focusing on the city, Ktown Connects, launched in August 2020 and has released over 100 episodes of interviews with many interesting Kenoshans including Mayor John Antaramian, WLIP's Lenny Palmer, Dr. Destruction of Crimson Theater, Kevin Ervin owner of Franks Diner, Jake "The Weather Guy" Hoey, and numerous others.

Infrastructure

Transportation
According to Walk Score, Kenosha is a largely "car dependent" city, with an overall walk score of 45/100 and has "minimal biking infrastructure", with an overall bike score of 49/100, though its downtown central business district has much higher scores, 84/100 and 72/100 respectively.

Major highways

Railroad
Kenosha has been served by rail service to and from Chicago since May 19, 1855, when the predecessors to the Chicago and North Western Railway, the Milwaukee and Chicago Railway Company (originally the Illinois Parallel Railroad) and the original "Lake Shore Railroad" (later the Green Bay, Milwaukee and Chicago Railway) were officially joined with great ceremony just south of today's 52nd Street. Today, the former C&NW line is operated by the Union Pacific Railroad while the former Milwaukee Road line is operated by the Soo Line Railroad, a division of the Canadian Pacific Railway.

Mass transit

The Chicagoland commuter rail network Metra has a line between Downtown Chicago and Kenosha. The Metra Kenosha station has seen ridership increase  as many in southeastern Wisconsin utilize the line to commute between southeastern Wisconsin and Chicago. 

Although some Union Pacific/North Line trains terminate and originate in Kenosha; most terminate at Waukegan, Illinois, to the south of Kenosha.

Since June 2000, a  streetcar line has served the downtown area and HarborPark, connecting the Metra station with downtown and several area parks. Kenosha is one of the smallest cities in America with any type of streetcar system today.

In addition to its streetcar line, Kenosha has a city bus network with eight routes. Kenosha was the first city to color-code transit routes (with the Blue, Green, Red, and Orange Lines), and also the first city to use electric trolley buses in full transit service, both occurring on February 14, 1932.

Kenosha Regional Airport (KENW) serves the city and surrounding communities. The city is located approximately 52 miles north of O'Hare International Airport in Chicago (one of the world's busiest airports) and approximately 32 miles south of General Mitchell International Airport in Milwaukee.

Health care

Kenosha has two hospitals: the Froedtert South Kenosha Medical Center Campus downtown and the Aurora Medical Center at the extreme western edge of the city limits. Just outside of the city limits in neighboring Pleasant Prairie is the St. Catherine's Medical Center Campus, which opened in 2002 and has a heart institute named in honor of cardiac surgeon Michael E. DeBakey.

Public safety
The Kenosha Police Department is responsible for the law enforcement in Kenosha since 1850, and is housed in the Kenosha Public Safety building. The Kenosha County Courthouse and Jail were added to the National Register of Historic Places in 1982. The jail and a separate facility, the Kenosha County Detention Center (KCDC), are operated by the sheriff's department. The Kenosha Correctional Center, a minimum security state prison, is also located in Kenosha and is under the operation of the Wisconsin Department of Corrections.

In August 2020, during the Kenosha unrest, a probation and parole building utilized by the Division of Community Corrections was burned down by rioters.

Notable people

Sister cities
Kenosha's sister cities are:
 Cosenza, Italy (since 1979)
 Douai, France (since 1981)
 Quezon City, Philippines (since 1986)
 Wolfenbüttel, Germany (since 1970)

See also
List of mayors of Kenosha, Wisconsin
Kenosha unrest

References

Further reading

External links

 
 Visit Kenosha
 Kenosha Area Chamber of Commerce
 Sanborn fire insurance maps: 1886 1890 1894 1900 1905 1911 1918
 

 
Chicago metropolitan area
Cities in Kenosha County, Wisconsin
Cities in Wisconsin
County seats in Wisconsin
Wisconsin populated places on Lake Michigan
Pre-Clovis archaeological sites in the Americas
Populated places established in 1835